The men's 50m backstroke S4 event at the 2012 Summer Paralympics took place at the  London Aquatics Centre on 6 September. There were two heats; the swimmers with the eight fastest times advanced to the final.

Results

Heats
Competed from 10:44.

Heat 1

Heat 2

Final
Competed at 18:52.

 
Q = qualified for final. EU = European Record.

References
Official London 2012 Paralympics Results: Heats 
Official London 2012 Paralympics Results: Final 

Swimming at the 2012 Summer Paralympics